Bethel Baptist Church, also known as First Baptist Church, Gresham Pioneer Church and Old First Baptist Church, was a church building located in Gresham, Oregon listed on the National Register of Historic Places. Built by Peter Engles in 1886, the church displayed Gothic Revival architecture and was constructed of brick and weatherboard.

The building was added to the National Register of Historic Places in 1982. The church burned on May 22, 2004 and was subsequently delisted from the National Register of Historic Places on April 18, 2006.

See also

 National Register of Historic Places listings in Multnomah County, Oregon
 Religion in Oregon

References

1886 establishments in Oregon
Baptist churches in Oregon
Buildings and structures in Gresham, Oregon
Churches on the National Register of Historic Places in Oregon
Former churches in Oregon
Former National Register of Historic Places in Oregon
Gothic Revival church buildings in Oregon
National Register of Historic Places in Gresham, Oregon